The 489th Bomb Group is a unit of the United States Air Force. It is assigned to the 307th Bomb Wing, and is stationed at Dyess Air Force Base, Texas.  The group is a reserve associate unit of the 7th Bomb Wing at Dyess.

During World War II, the 489th Bombardment Group was a Consolidated B-24 Liberator unit.  After training in the United States, it moved to England as an element of Eighth Air Force, stationed at RAF Halesworth, England. Lieutenant Colonel Leon Vance of the group was awarded the Medal of Honor for his bravery and actions on the day before D-Day over Wimereux, France. It was the only Medal of Honor awarded to a B-24 crewman for a mission flown from England. The group returned to the United States in November 1944 and converted to a Boeing B-29 Superfortress group, but the war ended before the group could deploy to the Pacific.

In October 2015, the group was reactivated in the Air Force Reserve.

History

World War II

Training in the United States
The 489th Bombardment Group, Heavy was activated as a Consolidated B-24 Liberator heavy bomber group on 1 October 1943 at Wendover Field, Utah. Its original squadrons were the 844th, 845th, 846th and 847th Bombardment Squadrons. Shortly after organizing, key personnel left for training with the Army Air Forces School of Applied Tactics in Florida, where it flew simulated combat missions in company with the 491st Bombardment Group leadership, which was at a similar point in its training. The group completed combat training and departed Wendover on 3 April 1944. The air echelon flew to the UK via the southern ferry route along the northern coastline of South America and across the Atlantic to Africa before heading North to England. The group moved to RAF Halesworth, England in May 1944, where it became part of Eighth Air Force.

Combat in Europe
The group entered combat on 30 May 1944 with an attack on Oldenburg, Germany. It then concentrated on targets striking in France to prepare for Operation Overlord, the invasion of Normandy.  In an attack against coastal defenses near Wimereux, France on 5 June, the group's lead plane was seriously crippled by enemy fire, its pilot was killed, and the deputy group commander, Lt Col Leon Vance, who was commanding the formation, was severely wounded.  Although his right foot was practically severed, Vance took control of the plane and led the group to a successful bombing of the target.  He flew the damaged Liberator near the English coastline where he ordered the crew to bail out. Under the belief that one wounded crewmember could not jump, Vance ditched the plane in the English Channel and was rescued. For his action during this mission, Vance was awarded the Medal of Honor.

The group supported the landings in Normandy the following day, and afterward bombed coastal defenses, airfields, bridges, railroads, and V-1 flying bomb and V-2 rocket launch sites (Operation Crossbow) in the campaign for France.  It participated in the saturation bombing of German lines just before Operation Cobra, the breakthrough at Saint-Lô in July.  The group dropped food to liberated French and to Allied forces in France during August and September, and carried food and ammunition to the Netherlands later in September. For these missions, a loadmaster from IX Troop Carrier Command directed the drops from the bombers. On other missions, group aircraft flew into Orleans/Bricy Airfield to deliver supplies.

The 489th began flying strategic bombing missions to Germany in July, and engaged primarily in bombing strategic targets such as factories, oil refineries and storage areas, marshalling yards, and airfields in Ludwigshafen, Magdeburg, Brunswick, Saarbrücken, and other cities until November 1944. At that time it was the first group in Eighth Air Force selected for redeployment to the Pacific theater and became non-operational on 14 November 1944 and most of its B-24s were assigned to other groups in England. It was relieved of assignment to the theater on 29 November 1944, and returned to the United States.

Redeployment for the Pacific
The 489th Bomb Group returned to Bradley Field Connecticut at the end of December 1944, where most returning personnel were reassigned to other units while the group moved to Lincoln Army Air Field, Nebraska.  At Lincoln it again became part of Second Air Force on 22 January 1945, they were informed that previous plans for refresher training had been cancelled and instead the group and its associated 369th Air Service Group were retrained as Boeing B-29 Superfortress combat and support units. However Second Air Force did not receive redesignation orders for the group until 17 March, until which time they were compelled to maintain duplicate rosters and tables of organization, one for a heavy bombardment group of four squadrons, and one for a very heavy bombardment group of three squadrons. The readiness date for the group air echelon was set back from 1 March to 1 August 1945. The group moved to Great Bend Army Air Field, Kansas in mid-February to re-equip with the B-29, and was redesignated the 489th Bombardment Group, Very Heavy in March.

The group was alerted for movement overseas in the summer of 1945, but with the Japanese surrender, the group was inactivated on 17 October 1945.

Air Force reserve
The Air Force reactivated the group as the Air Force Reserve Command's 489th Bomb Group on 17 October 2015, exactly 70 years after it was inactivated.  The 489th operates from Dyess Air Force Base near Abilene, Texas, flying Rockwell B-1 Lancers and is an associate unit of the Regular Air Force's 7th Bomb Wing, operating the same aircraft.  The 489th is assigned the 307th Bomb Wing, a Boeing B-52 Stratofortress unit at Barksdale Air Force Base, Louisiana.  Both the 489th and the 307th are "operationally-gained" by Air Force Global Strike Command when mobilized.

Lineage
 Constituted as the 489th Bombardment Group, Heavy on 14 September 1943
 Activated on 1 October 1943
 Redesignated 489th Bombardment Group, Very Heavy on 17 March 1945
 Inactivated on 17 October 1945
 Redesignated 489th Bomb Group on 8 October 2015
 Activated in the Air Force Reserve on 17 October 2015

Assignments
 Second Air Force, 1 October 1943 – April 1944
 95th Combat Bombardment Wing, 5 April 1944
 20th Combat Bombardment Wing, 14 August – 29 November 1944
 Second Air Force, 12 December 1944 – 17 October 1945
 307th Bomb Wing, 17 October 2015 – present

Components
 Operational squadrons
 345th Bomb Squadron, 17 October 2015 – present
 844th Bombardment Squadron, 1 October 1943 – 17 October 1945
 845th Bombardment Squadron, 1 October 1943 – 17 October 1945
 846th Bombardment Squadron, 1 October 1943 – 17 October 1945
 847th Bombardment Squadron, 13 October 1943 – 28 March 1945

 Support units
 489th Maintenance Squadron, 17 October 2015 – Present
 489th Aerospace Medical Flight, 17 October 2015 – Present
 1st Photographic Laboratory (Bombardment Group, Very Heavy), 17 March 1944 – 17 October 1945

Stations

 Wendover Field, Utah, 1 October 1943 – 3 April 1944
 RAF Halesworth (AAF-365), England, c. 1 May – November 1944 (Station 365)
 Bradley Field, Connecticut 12 December 1944
 Lincoln Army Air Field, Nebraska, c. 17 December 1944
 Great Bend Army Air Field, Kansas c. 18 February 1945

 Davis–Monthan Field, Arizona, 3 April 1945
 Fairmont Army Air Field, Nebraska c. 13 July 1945
 Fort Lawton, Washington 23 August 1945
 March Field, California 2 September – 17 October 1945
 Dyess Air Force Base 17 October 2015 – present

Aircraft
 Consolidated B-24 Liberator, 1943–1944
 Boeing B-29 Superfortress, 1945
 Rockwell B-1B Lancer, 2015–present

Campaigns

See also

 B-24 Liberator units of the United States Army Air Forces
 List of B-1 units of the United States Air Force
 List of B-29 Superfortress operators
 List of United States Air Force Groups

References

Notes

Citations

Bibliography

Further reading
 
 
 Freeman, Roger A. (1978) Airfields of the Eighth: Then and Now. After the Battle 
 Freeman, Roger A. (2001) The Mighty Eighth: The Colour Record. Cassell

External links
 
  (Repeats information in Maurer, Combat Units. Illustrated by picture of B-24 in group markings.)
  (Includes map showing location of RAF Halesworth)
 
 

Military units and formations in Texas
Bombardment groups of the United States Air Force
Military units and formations of the United States Air Force Reserves